These are the official results of the Men's 1.500 metres event at the 1997 World Championships in Athens, Greece. There were a total number of 44 participating athletes, with four qualifying heats, two semifinals and the final held on Wednesday 6 August 1997.

The final was a slow, tactical race from the start, with Morceli tracking El Guerrouj all the way. Estevez tried to slow the pace down even further in the second lap to allow Cacho to save energy for his fast sprint finish. With the whole field still bunched up with 600m to go, El Guerrouj put on a burst of speed which only Morceli and Cacho were able to follow, but eventually, they too were dropped as El Guerrouj wound up the pace faster and faster. Cacho sprinted past Morceli in the home straight, and the dispirited defending champion slowed down towards the finish, allowing Estevez to pip him at the line for the bronze medal.

Results

Heats
Held on Sunday 1997-08-03

Semifinals
Held on Monday 1997-08-04

Final

See also
 1994 Men's European Championships 1.500 metres (Helsinki)
 1996 Men's Olympic 1.500 metres (Atlanta)
 1998 Men's European Championships 1.500 metres (Budapest)

References
 Results
 Results - World Athletics

 
1500 metres at the World Athletics Championships

ru:Чемпионат мира по лёгкой атлетике 1995 — бег на 1500 метров (мужчины)